An Incident that no one noticed is a 1967 Soviet romance film directed by Aleksandr Volodin.

Plot 
The film tells about a modest saleswoman of a greengrocery store named Nastya, who dreams of becoming beautiful and happy. And suddenly the dream begins to come true.

Cast 
 Zhanna Prokhorenko as Nastya
 Vera Titova as Mother
 Yevgeny Lebedev as Yakov Alexeyevich (as Yevgeni Lebedev)
 Vitali Solomin as Tolya
 Georgiy Shtil as Lyosha
  as Katya
 Pavel Luspekayev as Teterin
 Arkadi Trusov
 Lidiya Shtykan as Nina Sergeyevna
 Iya Arepina
 Ignat Leyrer as A man in love

References

External links 
 

1967 films
1960s Russian-language films
Soviet romance films
1960s romance films
Soviet black-and-white films
Soviet teen films